Charles H. Osterhout   (1856–1933) was an American professional baseball player who played for the 1879 Syracuse Stars.

External links

Baseball players from Syracuse, New York
Syracuse Stars (NL) players
19th-century baseball players
1856 births
1933 deaths
Quincy Quincys players
Syracuse Stars (minor league baseball) players
Toronto Canucks players
Scranton Miners players
Easton (minor league baseball) players